Charlotte Lily Baidoo is a Ghanaian banker and the chief executive officer (CEO) of the Women's World Banking Ghana (WWBG). She joined the Women's World Bank (Ghana) as the chief executive officer (CEO)  in 2015.

In 2017, Charlotte Baidoo received  an honorable fellow award from the Institute of Certified Economist of Ghana (ICEG).

She was also nominated among the top 60 Corporate women leaders in Ghana by African Network of Entrepreneurs' flagship network called 'WomanRising'.

See also
 Women's World Banking

References

Year of birth missing (living people)
Living people
Ghanaian bankers
Women chief executives
Bank presidents and chief executive officers